Neesiidae is a family of worms belonging to the order Monostilifera.

Genera:
 Neoemplectonema Korotkevich, 1977
 Noteonemertes Gibson, 2002
 Paranemertes Coe, 1901
 Paranemertopsis Gibson, 1990
 Tortus Korotkevich, 1971
 Vulcanonemertes Gibson & Strand, 2002

References

Nemerteans